The 1998 Copenhagen Open was a men's tennis tournament played on indoor carpet courts in Copenhagen, Denmark that was part of the International Series of the 1998 ATP Tour. It was the eleventh edition of the tournament and was held from 9 March until 15 March 1998. Magnus Gustafsson won the singles title.

Finals

Singles

 Magnus Gustafsson defeated  David Prinosil, 3–6, 6–1, 6–1.
 It was Gustafsson's 1st title of the year and the 11th of his career.

Doubles

 Tom Kempers /  Menno Oosting defeated  Brett Steven /  Jan Siemerink, 6–4, 7–6.
 It was Kempers' 1st title of the year and the 3rd of his career. It was Oosting's only title of the year and the 7th of his career.

References

Copenhagen Open
1998
1998 in Danish tennis